Silvia Ballestra (born 1969) is an Italian writer. In 2006 she won the Rapallo Carige Prize.

Life
Ballestra was born in Porto San Giorgio in 1969.

She was discovered by Pier Vittorio Tondelli and began publishing novels, short stories and essays since 1990.

Her debut book was Birthday of the Iguana and it has been translated into several languages. From that book and the following book La guerra degli Antò was taken the script of a film, The Anto War by Riccardo Milani. She has a degree in Foreign Languages and Literature. She has edited various translations from both French and English. She has worked with the newspaper L'Unità and several magazines and other newspapers. She has lived and worked in Milan.

In 2006 she won the Rapallo Carige Prize for La seconda Dora.

Works include
Contribution to the anthology Papergang, under 25, 1990 
Birthday of the Iguana, 1991, Transeuropea and Arnoldo Mondadori Editore
The war of Anto, 1992 
The youthfulness of Miss NN, 1998 
La Seconda Dora
The hills across the street. A trip around the life of Tullio Pericoli, Rizzoli, 2011.

References

1969 births
Living people
People from the Province of Fermo
20th-century Italian novelists
21st-century Italian novelists
Italian women novelists
20th-century Italian women writers
21st-century Italian women writers